Vigilin is a 110 kDa protein that in humans is encoded by the HDLBP gene.

References

Further reading